Telekabel is a cable television operator and Internet Service Provider for Cable Internet in North Macedonia headquartered in Štip, North Macedonia. They also offer Telephony services.

The company relays more than 60 analogue channels, more than 50 digital channels and nine HD channels.

See also
 Television in North Macedonia

External links
 Telekabel on avmu.mk

References

Telecommunications in North Macedonia
Mobile phone companies of North Macedonia
Telecommunications companies of North Macedonia
Telecommunications companies established in 1997
Macedonian companies established in 1997